Aref al-Khodja is a Libyan political leader who was the Minister of Interior of Libya in the Government of National Accord. He is an Islamist and held the post of interior minister in the Tripoli-based government, the General National Congress. Al-Khoga has a police background.

References

Libyan politicians
Living people
Year of birth missing (living people)